Evening – Night – Morning is a 1920 silent German drama film directed by F. W. Murnau. The film is considered to be lost. It was shot at the Weissensee Studios in Berlin. The film's sets were designed by the art director Robert Neppach.

Plot
Maud (Gertrude Welcker) is the lover of Chester (Bruno Ziener), a millionaire who showers her with cash and gifts. Maud funnels some of her cash and jewels to her dissolute brother, Brillburn. Brillburn sees a particularly valuable pearl necklace in a shop window, and tells Maud to ask for it. She does, and Chester buys it for her. Chester tells his friend, the heavily indebted Prince (Carl von Balla), about the necklace.

That night, Prince breaks into Chester's home to steal the necklace. Not knowing where it is, he purposefully breaks a vase. Chester comes down to investigate, and Prince sees where he has hidden the necklace. Prince knocks Chester unconscious, then starts to fake Chester's suicide by hanging. He smokes a cigarette while typing out a suicide note. Just then, Brillburn enters the house to steal the necklace. Realizing he must stash the necklace or be caught, Prince goes into the adjacent coal room and hides the necklace. He removes a large lump of coal to make the pile look normal again.

Meanwhile, Brillburn finds Chester with a noose around his neck. He uses his dagger to cut the noose off, and losing a button from his coat in the process. Brillburn now flees, just as Chester throws the lump of coal out the window. The coal hits Brillburn on the head, knocking him cold.

Maud wakes and finds the house in disarray, preventing Prince from leaving. Det. Ward (Otto Gebühr) is summoned. He finds Brillburn unconscious on the lawn, and immediately suspects he assaulted and robbed Chester. When Det. Ward discovers the butt of Prince's expensive cigarette, he realizes another man was in the house. When questioned, Prince tells contradictory lies about why he was in the house. The lump of coal leads Ward to the stashed necklace. He waits for the robber to reappear and claim his loot, and duly arrests Prince.

Cast
 Bruno Ziener as Chester, Maud's lover
 Gertrude Welcker as Maud
 Conrad Veidt as Brillburn, Maud's brother
 Carl von Balla as Prince, a gambler
 Otto Gebühr as Detective Ward

See also
List of lost films

References

External links

1920 films
German silent feature films
1920 drama films
German black-and-white films
Films of the Weimar Republic
Films directed by F. W. Murnau
Lost German films
German drama films
1920 lost films
Lost drama films
Silent drama films
Films shot at Weissensee Studios
1920s German films